The Alpha 29, also called the Albin Alpha, is a Swedish sailboat that was designed by Peter Norlin and first built in 1984.

Production
The design was built by Albin Marine in Sweden between 1984 and 1991, with 200 boats completed, but it is now out of production.

Design
The Alpha 29 is a recreational keelboat, built predominantly of fibreglass, with wood trim. It has a fractional sloop rig, a raked stem, a reverse transom, an internally mounted spade-type rudder and a fixed fin keel. It displaces  and carries  of ballast.

See also
List of sailing boat types

References

External links
Photo of an Alpha 29
Sailing the Albin 29 video
Sailing the Albin 29 under gennaker video

Keelboats
1980s sailboat type designs
Sailing yachts
Sailboat type designs by Peter Norlin
Sailboat types built by Albin Marine